The Holy Land, Syria, Idumea, Arabia, Egypt, and Nubia is a travelogue of 19th-century Palestine and the magnum opus of Scottish painter David Roberts. It contains 250 lithographs by Louis Haghe of Roberts's watercolor sketches. It was first published by subscription between 1842 and 1849, in two separate publications: The Holy Land, Syria, Idumea and Arabia and Egypt and Nubia. William Brockedon and George Croly wrote much of the text, Croly writing the historical, and Brockedon the descriptive portions.

Described as "one of the art-publishing sensations of the mid-Victorian period", it exceeded all other earlier lithographic projects in scale, and was one of the most expensive publications of the nineteenth century. Haghe has been described by the Metropolitan Museum of Art as "the best and most prolific lithographer of the time"

According to Professor Annabel Wharton, it has "proved to be the most pervasive and enduring of the nineteenth-century renderings of the East circulated in the West."

Travels and publication
Roberts began his travel to the region in August 1838. He landed at Alexandria, and spent the rest of 1838 in Cairo. In February 1839 he traveled to Palestine via Suez, Mount Sinai and Petra. From Gaza he traveled to Jerusalem, and around the rest of the region. He returned to England at the end of 1839 after falling ill, having spent 11 months in the region. A total of 272 watercolour sketches were shared with the publisher F.G. Moon in 1840 who paid Roberts £3,000 for copyright to the sketches.

Reaction
Famed Victorian art critic John Ruskin wrote the work was a "true portraiture of scenes of historical and religious interest. They are faithful and laborious beyond any outlines from nature I have ever seen."

Art historian John Roland Abbey wrote in his Travel in Aquatint and Lithography, 1770-1860 that "Robert's Holy Land was one of the most important and elaborate ventures of nineteenth-century publishing, and it was the apotheosis of the tinted lithograph".

John James Moscrop noted in a recent work on nineteenth century knowledge of Palestine: "The best known of the illustrators was David Roberts. If Robinson produced the nineteenth century's historical geography of the Holy Land, it fell to a Scottish painter, David Roberts, to illustrate it."

Criticism of orientalism
The images have been widely criticized as providing an orientalist perspective on the region. Uzi Baram wrote: "From Said's critique of Orientalism, it is clear that Roberts created picturesque landscapes that embodied British concerns and imagery, landscapes that were translated for the Western gaze. Roberts did not simply capture the landscapes of Palestine; similar to the other Orientalists, he fashioned an image of the Holy Land rather than representing all that he saw."

Meyers states that Roberts was "orientalizing the picturesque ideal in a Levantine setting", and Proctor writes that the images were not an accurate representation but rather a figment of the Western imagination. Bendiner proposed multiple influences underlying Roberts's orientalist style, including his social conscience, opulent taste, self-confidence, sense of history, contemporary international rivalries, and the religious questions of the day.

List of lithographs

Volume 1

Volume 2

Volume 3
88. Title page. Temple of El-Khasne, Petra.

Volume 4
126. Frontispiece. View under the Grand Portico, Philoe.
127. Tile page. Entrance to the Great Temple of Aboo-Simbel, Nubia.

Volume 5
169. Frontispiece. Front elevation of the Great Temple of Aboo-Simbel.

Volume 6

References

Bibliography

External links
Volumes 1 and 2
Volumes 3 and 4
Volumes 5 and 6

 Image collection on oldbookart.com

Holy Land travellers
1842 non-fiction books
Travelogues
Lithographs